The Škoda 1000 MB and Škoda 1100 MB are two rear-engined, rear-wheel drive small family cars that were produced by Czechoslovakian manufacturer AZNP in Mladá Boleslav between 1964 and 1969. The 2-door coupé versions of the 1000 MB and 1100 MB were called the 1000 MBX and 1100 MBX.

New layout introduction 
In 1955, the same year in which the Škoda 440/445 made its first appearance, Škoda started making plans for a new car for the 1960s. The initial plans for the car were to make the car as light and fuel-efficient as possible: it was to weigh no more than 700 kg, and the overall fuel consumption was not to exceed 6-7 litres per 100 kilometres (33-38mpg).

The next step was to produce the car as a four-door saloon, which would be built using monocoque construction. Like most leading car manufacturers dating from before the Second World War, Škoda always built their cars using the traditional and well-proven front-engine and rear-wheel drive layout.

The front-engined-with-front-wheel-drive option was unsuccessful due to higher cost and design complexity, and therefore Škoda opted for the rear-engined-with-rear-wheel-drive format. Even by the early 1960s, the idea of rear-engined small family saloons was still considered to be reasonably popular. In France, there were the Renault Dauphine, Renault 8 and Simca 1000, while in Germany there were the Volkswagen Beetle and NSU Prinz, in Italy there were the Fiats 500 and 600, and in Britain there was the Hillman Imp, all of which employed the rear-engined concept.

A new era for Škoda 
The Škoda 1000 MB (the letters ‘MB’ coming from the initials of Mladá Boleslav) made its debut in April 1964, as the successor for the Škoda Octavia. This was just the beginning of what was to eventually evolve into a long line of rear-engined Škodas. The engine that powered the 1000 MB was a 988cc (1-litre), 4-cylinder, overhead valve (OHV) unit that produced . It was water-cooled, with an aluminum cylinder block and cast iron cylinder head. The 1000 MB had a four-speed manual all-synchromesh gearbox, all-round independent suspension, swing axle rear suspension, and drum brakes at the front and rear.

The 1000 MB was a stylish four-door saloon (measuring 13 feet 8 inches in length and 5 feet 4 inches in width, with a wheelbase of 7 feet 10 inches), which featured a steeply sloping nose that was flanked by rounded front wings (not unlike the Ford Anglia 105E of the time). Being a rear-engined car, the 1000 MB's radiator and (engine-driven) cooling fan were situated in the rear engine compartment, so therefore a series of slats were cut into each rear wing and the rear panel to increase the flow rate of air in order to assist in keeping the engine cool. Apart from the use of cooling vents in the rear wings and rear panel, everything else about the 1000 MB's styling was normal, which was undoubtedly in an attempt to appeal to all the conservative-minded buyers in export countries like the UK. This car was highly successful both for Škoda and the Czechoslovak economy.

By early 1965, the British were starting to receive the 1000 MB, which was being priced at a reasonable £579, which worked out cheaper than similarly-sized four-door saloons like the Ford Cortina 1200 (at £592) and the Hillman Minx Deluxe (at £636). Despite being affordably priced, the 1000 MB was well equipped, with reclining front seats, a heater and demister, full tool kit, and a generously sized boot up front as well as a useful storage area behind the split/folding rear seat. Many salesman rightly stated over the years that the 1000 MB was “a lot of car for the money.”

The 1000 MB's overall performance was acceptable, especially when you remember how small an engine it had for a car of its size (as mentioned, a 1-litre engine in a car 13 feet 8 inches long by 5 feet 3 inches wide). The top speed was 120 km/h (75 mph), reaching 100 km/h (62 mph) from standstill in 27 seconds. Overall fuel economy was around 36 miles per gallon (6.5 litres per 100 km).

By the late 1960s, Škoda felt it was time for an update of the ‘MB series, which they did with the introduction of the Škoda 100 and Škoda 110 in August 1969. By the time it was updated, a total of 443,141 ‘MBs were built. The ‘MBX series was produced in very limited numbers (2,517 in total) and is therefore an extreme rarity these days.

Production figures

'MB series timeline 
April 2, 1964 - Introduction of the 1000 MB (Type 990) four-door saloon. It had a rear-mounted 988cc four-cylinder engine giving  at 4650 rpm.
April 1, 1966 - Introduction of the 1000 MB de Luxe (Type 721) four-door saloon with a more powerful  version of the 988 cc engine. It had better trim than the standard 'MB.
April 3, 1966 - Introduction of the 1000 MB (Type 721) and 1000 MBG de Luxe (Type 710) four-door saloons and 1000 MBX de Luxe 2-door coupe (Type 990T). The standard 1000 MB now had the same engine as the MB de Luxe, while the 'MBG and 'MBX had a twin carburettor 52 hp (38 kW) version of the same engine.
 1967 - The 1100 MB De Luxe and 1100 MBX De Luxe models enter production  
 September 1969 - All 'MB series replaced by the new Škoda 100 series.

Gallery

Models

Details

References

External links 

 Development history, prototypes, pictures, technical data, spare parts catalog 
 Škoda 1000 MB road test 

1000MB
Cars powered by rear-mounted 4-cylinder engines
Cars introduced in 1964
Coupés
Sedans